Crack frequently refers to: 

 Crack, a fracture in a body
 Crack, a fracture (geology) in a rock
 Crack, short for crack cocaine

Crack may also refer to:

Art, entertainment, and media
 Cracks (film), a 2009 independent thriller
 Crack Movement, a Mexican literary movement
 Crack (band), a Spanish progressive rock group
 Crack (album), an album by Z-RO
 Cracks (album), an album by Nabiha
 The Crack, first album by The Ruts
 Crack Magazine, a UK-based European music and culture monthly
 The Crack (magazine), a free culture magazine covering the North East of England

Slang
 Crack, carrack

Gaining entry 

 Safe cracking, the process of opening a safe without the combination or the key

Software
 Crack (password software), a UNIX/Linux password hacking program for systems administrators
 Software cracking, a computer program that modifies other software to remove or disable features usually related to digital rights management
 No-disc crack, software to circumvent Compact Disc and DVD copy protection
Password cracking, the process of recovering passwords from data stored in or transmitted by a computer system
Security hacker, cracking a system to gain unauthorized access (sometimes mislabeled as "hacking")

Other uses
 Cracking (chemistry), the process whereby complex organic molecules are broken down into simpler molecules 
 Crack spread, the value difference between crude oil and oil products or between different oil products, usually expressed as a per-barrel value
 CRACK, an acronym for 'Children Requiring A Caring Kommunity', now called 'Project Prevention'
 CRACK International Art Camp
Craic, or crack, an Irish term for discourse, news, etc.

See also
 CRAC (disambiguation)
 Crack-Up (disambiguation)
 Cracker (disambiguation)
 Cracking (disambiguation)
 Crak!, 1963 pop art lithograph by Roy Lichtenstein
 Krack (disambiguation)
 Krak (disambiguation)